Janseola fulvithorax is a moth in the family Heterogynidae. It was described by George Hampson.

References

Heterogynidae